The 2005–06 season in Portuguese football saw Porto, led by Co Adriaanse, clinch their 21st title and win the Taça de Portugal. Sporting CP secured second place, which gives them a direct entrance into next season's UEFA Champions League. Benfica had a disappointing season, although they returned to the spotlight of European football with a good run in the Champions League, reaching the quarter-finals.

Braga and Nacional challenged Sporting CP, Benfica and Porto for a major part of the season. Nacional, in particular, broke up "Big Three" for most of the season, defeating Sporting 2–1 at home in a memorable victory before ultimately falling away towards the end of the season. Braga finished the season in fourth place and Nacional finished fifth in the table after having slipped all the way to seventh at one point. Two famous Portuguese clubs, Vitória de Guimarães and Belenenses, were relegated.

Also of note was the suspension of Benfica midfielder Nuno Assis after testing positive for a banned substance in a league match . This positive test has been challenged very aggressively by Benfica's management, as the tests seem to have failed to follow proper procedures , as 72 hours passed between the collection of the sample and the tests.

Early in the season, Benfica won the SuperCup Cândido de Oliveira in a match against previous cup winner Vitória de Setúbal.

In European club competitions, Benfica reached the quarter-finals of the Champions League after eliminating Manchester United in the group phase and title-holders Liverpool in the last-32, only to be eliminated in the quarter-finals by eventual Champions Barcelona. Meanwhile, Porto had a relatively poor European season, failing to qualify through the group stage and finishing fourth in their group, missing out in a spot in the 2005–06 UEFA Cup final phase. Sporting was eliminated in the third qualifying round of the Champions League by Udinese and, after demotion to qualification for the UEFA Cup, was eliminated at the hands of Halmstads BK. All Portuguese teams failed to qualify for the group stage of the UEFA Cup save for Vitória de Guimarães, which surpassed Wisła Kraków but failed to progress past the group stages.

In international football, the Portugal national team secured a place in Germany's 2006 FIFA World Cup, where they were grouped alongside Mexico, Iran and newcomer Angola.

Honours

Liga

Promoted teams
These teams were promoted from the Liga de Honra at the start of the season:
Paços de Ferreira (champion)
Naval 1° de Maio (2nd placed)
Estrela da Amadora (3rd placed)

Final standings

UEFA competitions and relegations
These teams were qualified for the UEFA competitions of 2006-07:
 UEFA Champions League
 Champions Porto (group stage)
 2nd place Sporting CP (group stage)
 3rd place Benfica (third qualifying round)
 UEFA Cup
 4th place Braga (first round)
 5th place Nacional (first round)
 Cup finalist Vitória de Setúbal

These teams were relegated to the League of Honour at the end of the season:
 Relegations
 12th place Gil Vicente (relegated in sport courts)
 16th place Rio Ave
 17th place Vitória de Guimarães
 18th place Penafiel

The SuperLiga will be reduced from 18 to 16 teams for 2006–07. To accommodate this, four teams were relegated from the SuperLiga, with only two promoted from the Liga da Honra.

Top scorers
 1 Albert Meyong (Belenenses) 17
 2 João Tomás (Braga) 15
 2 Liédson (Sporting CP) 15
 2 Nuno Gomes (Benfica) 15
 5 André Pinto (Nacional) 14
 6 Joeano (Académica) 13
 7 Marek Saganowski (Vitória de Guimarães) 12
 8 Alexandre Goulart (Nacional) 11
 9 Gaúcho (Rio Ave) 10
 9 Lucho González (Porto) 10

UEFA competitions

Sporting CP

UEFA Champions League third qualifying round

UEFA Cup first round

Porto

UEFA Champions League group H

Benfica

UEFA Champions League group D

UEFA Champions League first knockout round

UEFA Champions League quarter-finals

Braga

UEFA Cup first round

Vitória de Setúbal

UEFA Cup first round

Vitória de Guimarães

UEFA Cup first round

UEFA Cup group H

Cup of Portugal
Porto won their 17th Portuguese Cup after beating Vitória de Setúbal) 1–0 on 14 May 2006.

Round of 16 to Final

Liga de Honra

Promoted and relegated teams
These teams were relegated from the Primeira Liga at the start of the season:
 Gil Vicente (12th placed, relegated in sport courts)
 Moreirense (16th placed)
 Estoril (17th placed)
 Beira-Mar (18th placed)

These teams were promoted from the Portuguese Second Division B at the start of the season:
 FC Vizela (Northern Zone champion)
 Sporting Covilhã (Central Zone champion)
 FC Barreirense (Southern Zone champion)

Final standings

Promotions and relegations
These teams were promoted to the Liga betandwin.com at the end of the season:
Promotions
Champions Beira-Mar
2nd placed Desportivo das Aves

These teams were relegated to the Second Division at the end of the season:
Relegations
13th placed Moreirense
14th placed Sporting Covilhã
15th placed Barreirense
16th placed Marco
17th placed Ovarense
18th placed Maia

Top scorers
Only players with at least 10 goals

Second Division

Promoted and relegated teams
The organization of the Second Division was changed for the 2005-06 season. The name was changed from Second Division B to Second Division, and the Northern, Central and Southern zones were abolished to be replaced by another geographical scheme with 4 alphabetically named series.

Only one team was relegated from the League of Honour at the start of the season:
 18th placed Espinho

16th placed Gondomar and 17th placed Chaves that would normally be relegated to the Second Division, were allowed to play again in the League of Honour, since 11th placed Felgueiras and 13th placed Alverca closed their football sections.

These teams were promoted from the Terceira Divisão at the start of the season:
 Serie A champions GDRC «Os Sandinenses»
 Serie A runners-up GD União Torcatense
 Serie B champions Aliados Lordelo F.C.
 Serie B runners-up FC Famalicão
 Serie C champions SL Nelas
 Serie C runners-up CF União de Coimbra
 Serie D champions AD Portomosense
 Serie D runners-up UD Rio Maior
 Serie E champions S.L. Benfica B
 Serie E runners-up Real Sport Clube
 Serie F champions Silves FC
 Serie F runner-up Imortal DC
 Serie Azores champions (and winner of the playoff) FC Madalena

At the end of the 2004-05 season, the winner of the Third Division Serie Azores had to a playoff with the worst placed Azorean team in the Second Division B Southern Zone. 13th placed SC Lusitânia lost the first leg 1-2 to Serie Azores champions FC Madalena, but won the second leg 1-0. Because the Portuguese system doesn't apply the away goal rule, the teams went to penalties, in which Madalena won 5-4.

Meanwhile, Académico de Viseu, that was scheduled to play in the 2005-06 season in the Second Division Series C, decided to quit early in the season, and was accordingly relegated to the district championships. Another entrance in the division was the reserve team Vitória FC "de Setúbal" B.

Final standings

Série A

Série B

Série C

Série D

Promotion and relegation
According to the Portuguese Football Federation, only two teams will be promoted to the League of Honour at the end of the season. The champions of Series A will play their Series B counterparts in a playoff, and the same will happen for the champions of Series D and C. The winners will be promoted to the League of Honour.

 Lousada (B) vs. Trofense (A)
 Olivais e Moscavide (D) vs. Oliveirense (C)

Also according to the Federation, the last 4 of every Series will be relegated to the Third Division. And, if a reserve "B" team is relegated or quits, another additional team will be relegated to the Third Division.

Relegations
Series A
11th placed S.C. Freamunde
12th placed C. Atlético de Valdevez
13th placed Vilaverdense FC
14th placed GD União Torcatense
Series B
11th placed Fiães SC
12th placed Aliados Lordelo F.C.
13th placed FC Pedras Rubras
14th placed A.D. Sanjoanense
Series C
11th placed AD Portomosense
12th placed Sport Benfica e Castelo Branco
13th placed CF União de Coimbra
14th placed F.C. Oliveira do Hospital
Series D
12th placed Real Sport Clube
13th placed Casa Pia AC
14th placed Vitória FC "de Setúbal" B
15th placed Silves FC
16th placed Oriental de Lisboa

Portugal national team

KEY:  WCQ3 = World Cup Qualification match - Group 3; F = Friendly

References

 
Seasons in Portuguese football
Portugal
Football
Football